Caledonia, Nova Scotia is a community located in northern Region of Queens Municipality, Nova Scotia along Trunk 8 (Kejimkujik Scenic Drive). Caledonia is the major community in the area known as North Queens, which has a radius of approximately 30 kilometers (20 miles) and a population of approximately 1500.

Geography
Caledonia is 50 kilometres north of Liverpool along Highway 8. 17 kilometres further north of Caledonia, in Maitland Bridge, is the main entrance to Kejimkujik National Park.

History
The original settlers of Caledonia were six Scots and an Irishman, who settled on the seven hills in greater Caledonia.  Caledonia was the Latin name given by the Romans to the area of modern-day Scotland, and with Nova Scotia translating as 'New Scotland', also from Latin, the names in the area obviously reflect this heritage.

In 1884, Caledonia served as the hub for the gold rush in the nearby communities of Whiteburne and North Brookfield.

The N.F. Douglas lumber mill in Caledonia was one of the area's main employers until its closure in 2014.  Other industries include forestry, farming, a blueberry processing operation, and Kejimkujik National Park. Caledonia has a range of shops and services including; grocery, pharmacy, hardware store, post office, cafe/restaurants, medical centre, outdoor swimming pool and a Nova Scotia Liquor Commission outlet.

North Queens Community School, operated by South Shore Regional School Board, provides education from grades primary to twelve.

Each September, Caledonia plays host to the Queens County Fair, which includes a parade and one of the oldest agricultural exhibitions in Nova Scotia.

Caledonia was formerly the end of a Canadian National Railway branch line. The line was long ago abandoned but has recently been refurbished as part of a rails-to-trails program by the Brookfield Mines Trails Association, creating a multi-use path from Caledonia to Colpton. The 18 km stretch of trail has signage, gates, and benches.

Communications 

 Postal Code        B0T 1B0
 Telephone exchange
  902 – 682- Aliant
  902 – 390- Telus
 Wireless Broadband provided by EastLink Rural Wireless Internet under the Government of Nova Scotia's Broadband for Rural Nova Scotia initiative
 Television
 CBHT  Channel 2 – 600W
 CJCH   Channel 6
 Cable

Demographics 
 Total Dwellings  – 400
 Total Land Area  – 184.235 km2

References

External links
 Mersey Tobeatic Research Institute
N.F. Douglas lumber mill (closed)
North Queens School

Communities in the Region of Queens Municipality
General Service Areas in Nova Scotia